Rob Flaska (born March 23, 1960) is an American former basketball coach.  He served as the head men's basketball coach at Centenary College of Louisiana from 2005 to 2008.  His contract was not renewed following his third season with the Gentlemen.

Prior to arriving at Centenary, Flaska served as an assistant coach at the University of Arkansas and Texas Christian University (TCU), playing integral parts in recruiting at both schools.  Flaska was also a head coach at the junior college level, spending five years as the head man at Mott Community College in Flint, Michigan, and another three years as head coach at Florida Community College at Jacksonville.

Flaska played college basketball at Michigan Technological University, where he set career records in steals and assists.

Head coaching record

College

References

1960 births
Living people
American men's basketball coaches
Arkansas Razorbacks men's basketball coaches
Basketball coaches from Illinois
Centenary Gentlemen basketball coaches
Detroit Mercy Titans men's basketball coaches
Indiana State Sycamores men's basketball coaches
Junior college men's basketball coaches in the United States
Michigan Tech Huskies men's basketball players
People from Normal, Illinois
TCU Horned Frogs men's basketball coaches
UT Rio Grande Valley Vaqueros men's basketball coaches
Texas Southern Tigers men's basketball coaches
American men's basketball players